Soyuqbulaq or Soyukbulak or Soyukbulaq  may refer to:
Soyuqbulaq, Agstafa, Azerbaijan
Soyuqbulaq, Gadabay, Azerbaijan
Soyuqbulaq, Jalilabad, Azerbaijan
Soyuqbulaq, Kalbajar, Azerbaijan
Soyuqbulaq, Lachin, Azerbaijan